Ziaur Rahman (1936–1981) was the President of Bangladesh from 1976 until 1981.

Ziaur Rahman or Zia ur Rehman is a male Muslim given name, meaning Light of the Most Merciful. Other notable bearers of the name include:

 Md. Ziaur Rahman (born 1952), a Bangladeshi politician from Chapai Nawabganj
 Shah Mohammad Ziaur Rahman (born 1955), Chief of Staff of the Bangladesh Air Force
 Syed Ziaur Rahman (born 1972), Indian pharmacologist
 Ziaur Rahman (chess player) (born 1974), Bangladeshi chess player
 Ziaur Rahman Zia (born 1975), Bangladeshi musician
 Ziaur Rahman (kabaddi) (born 1981), Bangladeshi kabaddi player
 Zia Ur Rehman (born 1981), Pakistani journalist
 Ziaur Rahman (Bangladeshi cricketer) (born 1986), Bangladeshi cricketer
 Ziaur Rahman (Afghan cricketer) (born 1998), Afghan cricketer
 Qari Ziaur Rahman, Afghan reported to be Taliban leader
 Dhiya Ur-Rahman Azmi, author, scholar, professor